Non-metropolitan districts, or colloquially "shire districts", are a type of local government district in England. As created, they are sub-divisions of non-metropolitan counties (colloquially shire counties) in a two-tier arrangement. Non-metropolitan districts with borough status are known as boroughs, able to appoint a mayor and refer to itself as a borough council.

Non-metropolitan districts
Non-metropolitan districts are subdivisions of English non-metropolitan counties which have a two-tier structure of local government. Most non-metropolitan counties have a county council and several districts, each with a borough or district council. In these cases local government functions are divided between county and district councils, to the level where they can be practised most efficiently:

Borough/district councils are responsible for local planning and building control, local roads, council housing, environmental health, markets and fairs, refuse collection and recycling, cemeteries and crematoria, leisure services, parks, and tourism.
County councils are responsible for running the largest and most expensive local services such as education, social services, libraries, main roads, public transport, fire services, Trading Standards, waste disposal and strategic planning.

Status
Many districts have borough status, which means the local council is called a borough council instead of district council and gives them the right to appoint a mayor.  Borough status is granted by royal charter and, in many cases, continues a style enjoyed by a predecessor authority, which can date back centuries. Some districts such as Oxford or Exeter have city status, granted by letters patent, but this does not give the local council any extra powers other than the right to call itself a city council.  Not all city or borough councils are non-metropolitan districts, many being unitary authorities – districts which are ceremonially part of a non-metropolitan county, but not run by the county council – or metropolitan districts – which are subdivisions of the metropolitan counties created in 1974, but whose county councils were abolished in 1986 and are effectively unitary authorities with similar powers.

History
By 1899, England had been divided at district level into rural districts, urban districts, municipal boroughs, county boroughs and metropolitan boroughs. This system was abolished by the London Government Act 1963 and the Local Government Act 1972. Non-metropolitan districts were created by this act in 1974 when England outside Greater London was divided into metropolitan counties and non-metropolitan counties. Metropolitan counties were sub-divided into metropolitan districts and the non-metropolitan counties were sub-divided into non-metropolitan districts. The metropolitan districts had more powers than their non-metropolitan counterparts. Initially, there were 296 non-metropolitan districts in the two-tier structure, but reforms in the 1990s and 2009 reduced their number to 192. A further 55 non-metropolitan districts are now unitary authorities, which combine the functions of county and borough/district councils.

Scotland and Wales
In Wales, an almost identical two-tier system of local government existed between 1974 and 1996 (see Districts of Wales). In 1996, this was abolished and replaced with an entirely unitary system of local government, with one level of local government responsible for all local services.  Since the areas for Wales and England had been enacted separately and there were no Welsh metropolitan areas, the term 'non-metropolitan district' does not apply to Wales. A similar system existed in Scotland, which in 1975 was divided into regions and districts, this was also abolished in 1996 and replaced with a fully unitary system.

District Councils' Network
In England 200 out of the 201 non-metropolitan district councils are represented by the District Councils' Network, special interest group which sits within the Local Government Association. The network's purpose is to "act as an informed and representative advocate for districts to government and other national bodies, based on their unique position to deliver for ‘local’ people.”

List of counties and districts
This is a list of two-tier non-metropolitan counties and their districts. All unitary authorities are non-metropolitan districts, which, with the exception of those of Berkshire, are coterminous with non-metropolitan counties.

For a full list of districts of all types including unitary authorities, metropolitan districts and London boroughs, see Districts of England.

List of abolished non-metropolitan districts
This is a list of former two-tier districts in England which have been abolished, by local government reorganisations such as the 2009 structural changes to local government in England. It does not include districts that still exist after becoming a unitary authority or those that transferred from one county to another, including those that changed name. Nor does it include unitary authorities that have been abolished (Bournemouth and Poole).

See also

List of articles about local government in the United Kingdom
District Councils' Network
2019 structural changes to local government in England

Notes

References

External links
Map of the UK counties and unitary administrations 
Map of all UK local authorities

Local government in England
Interested parties in planning in England
 
1974 establishments in England